The Legend of Guan Gong is a 2004 Chinese television series based on the story of Guan Yu, a general of the late Han Dynasty. The series has been released in North America by Image Entertainment.

Plot
The story begins with Guan Yu's early life, when he is forced to flee his hometown to avoid arrest after killing a local bully. After a long journey and experiencing hardship, Guan meets Liu Bei and Zhang Fei and becomes sworn brothers with them in the Oath of the Peach Garden. Since then, the three of them have dedicated their lives to defending the Han Dynasty and bringing peace to the empire.

The series differs from Guan Yu's official biography in Records of Three Kingdoms, folk tales about him and his story in the 14th century novel Romance of the Three Kingdoms by Luo Guanzhong. It focuses on four main events in Guan's life story: Oath of the Peach Garden; crossing five passes and slaying six generals; Guan Yu attends the banquet alone and Guan Yu's defeat and death.

Cast
 Wang Yingquan as Guan Yu
 Li Wenshuai as young Guan Yu
 Zhang Youling as Zhang Fei
 Huang Xiangyang as Liu Bei
 Li Xinyu as Diaochan
 Tian Hairong as Qingluo
 Sun Li as Taohua
 Heizi as Cao Cao
 Yizhen as Lü Bu
 Jin Bo as Zhao Yun
 Wang Guanghui as Zhuge Liang
 Xie Ning as Xu Chu
 Yang Meng as Xiahou Dun
 He Shengwei as Cao Ren
 Wu Yuhe as Jie'er
 Fan Yan as Lady Mi
 You Liping as Hua Tuo

See also
 List of media adaptations of Romance of the Three Kingdoms

External links
 Description at Boston Public Library

2004 Chinese television series debuts
2004 Chinese television series endings
Works based on Romance of the Three Kingdoms
Television series set in the Eastern Han dynasty
Mandarin-language television shows
Chinese historical television series